The  was an infantry support gun used by the Imperial Japanese Army in the Second Sino-Japanese War and World War II. The Type 11 designation was given to this gun as it was accepted in the 11th year of Emperor Taishō's reign (1922).

History and development
The Type 11 infantry gun entered service in 1922. It was intended to be used against enemy machine gun positions and light tanks, and in a modified form was used to equip some early Japanese tanks (the Japanese Renault NC27 and some early Type 89 I-Go medium tanks). It had been largely been superseded by the Type 94 37 mm anti-tank gun by beginning of the Pacific War.

Design
The Type 11 infantry gun was based on the French Canon d'Infanterie de 37 modèle 1916 TRP, for which Japan bought a production license after World War I, and modified it to suit Japanese requirements. It fired from a tubular steel tripod and used a vertically sliding breechblock, that was opened and closed by a lever on the right side of the gun. The gun was fired by pulling sharply on a cord hanging from its rear, which drove a lever into the firing pin, which impacted and initiated the percussion cap in the rear of the shell.

It was intended to be carried into action by its gunners using the rear legs of the gun as carrying poles and lacked wheels entirely, with a pair of removable poles at the front allowing four soldiers to lift the weapon. The rear legs of the weapon were fitted with spades to firmly fix the gun in position.

The gun fired the Type 12 high-explosive shell, which contained 41 grams of explosive, as well as an ineffective anti-tank shell.

Combat record

The Type 11 infantry support guns were typically assigned in groups of four to combat infantry regiments. Each weapon was operated by a squad of 10 soldiers (a squad leader, four gunners (two of whom stood in reserve a little distance from the gun), three troops to carry ammunition and two troops who handled the pack horses used with the gun), and was kept in contact with the regimental headquarters (typically up to 300 meters) away by field telephone or messenger runners.

The gun was effective in the early stages of the Second-Sino-Japanese War for its intended purpose of providing heavy infantry firepower against semi-fortified positions, such as pillboxes, machine gun nests, and lightly armored vehicles. However, its low muzzle velocity, small caliber and low rate of fire rendered it quickly obsolete against Allied forces equipped with tanks, and it was seldom seen outside of reserve units during the Pacific War.

Similar Weapons 
3.7 cm Infanteriegeschütz M.15
37 mm trench gun M1915
3.7 cm TAK 1918
Canon d'Infanterie de 37 modèle 1916 TRP

References

Notes

Bibliography
 War Department TM-E-30-480 Handbook on Japanese Military Forces September 1944
 Chamberlain, Peter and Gander, Terry.  Infantry, Mountain and Airborne Guns . Macdonald and Jane's (1975). 
 Chant, Chris. Artillery of World War II, Zenith Press, 2001, 
 McLean, Donald B. Japanese Artillery; Weapons and Tactics. Wickenburg, Ariz.: Normount Technical Publications 1973. .
 Mayer, S.L. The Rise and Fall of Imperial Japan. The Military Press (1984) 
 Nakanishi, Ritta. Japanese Infantry Arms in World War II. Dainipponkaiga (1998) 
 US Department of War, TM 30-480, Handbook on Japanese Military Forces, Louisiana State University Press, 1994.

External links

 Type 11 on Taki's Imperial Japanese Army page
 US Technical Manual E 30-480

Infantry guns
37 mm artillery
1
Anti-tank guns of Japan
World War II infantry weapons of Japan